Chah Seyfollah (also Romanized as Chāh Seyfollāh) is a village in Rudkhaneh Bar Rural District, Rudkhaneh District, Rudan County, Hormozgan Province, Iran. At the 2006 census, its population was 77, in 15 families.

References 

Populated places in Rudan County